The Corps of Military Staff Clerks was an administrative corps of the Canadian Army. The Headquarters Corps of Military Staff Clerks was established in 1905.

The badge of the Corps of Military Staff Clerks consists of a circle, with a Kings Crown on top, superimposed on a pair of crossed quill pens, with the text "Corps of Military Staff Clerks" around the edge. At the center of the circle is a beaver.

The Corps of Military Staff Clerks was disbanded on 30 Sep 1946.

See also

 Staff clerk

References

Administrative corps of the Canadian Army
Army units and formations of Canada in World War I
Army units and formations of Canada in World War II
Military units and formations established in 1905
1905 establishments in Canada